Steven Finitsis (born 19 January 1983 in Innisfail, Queensland) is a former professional squash player who represented Australia. He reached a career-high world ranking of World No. 45 in July 2014.

References

External links 
 
 

1983 births
Living people
Australian male squash players
Commonwealth Games competitors for Australia
Squash players at the 2014 Commonwealth Games
People from Innisfail, Queensland
20th-century Australian people
21st-century Australian people